Heinz Ernst Jagodzinski (20 April 1916 in Aschersleben – 22 November 2012 in Munich) was a German physicist, mineralogist and crystallographer known for his research in disordered materials and diffuse X-ray scattering. He also introduced the Jagodzinski notation for the description of polytypism in silicon carbide.

Education and career 
Jagodzinski studied natural sciences at the University of Greifswald and later at the University of Göttingen, where he received his doctorate in physics in 1941 under Reinhold Mannkopff (Über die Druckabhängigkeit der Anregungstemperatur in der Lichtbogensäule). Between 1944 and 1945, he was research assistant at University of Halle-Wittenberg. Between 1946 and 1952, he was research assistant and received his habilitation at the University of Marburg, working under Fritz Laves.

From 1952 to 1963, he headed the crystal science department at the Max Planck Institute for Silicate Research in Würzburg, where he also became an adjunct professor at the University of Würzburg from 1955. In 1959, he became a professor of mineralogy at the Karlsruhe Institute of Technology. From 1963, Jagodzinski became a full professor of mineralogy and crystallography at the University of Munich, where he retired in 1986. From 1964 he was head of the Bavarian State Collection for Mineralogy.

Honors and awards 
In 2001, he received the Cothenius Medal from the German National Academy of Sciences, Leopoldina. He was a corresponding member of the Austrian Academy of Sciences, a member of the Bavarian Academy of Sciences (1969) and the Leopoldina. Among other things, he received an honorary doctorate from the University of Würzburg. In 1984 he received the Federal Cross of Merit, 1st class. Since 1965 he was a member of the Max Planck Society. In 1996 he became an honorary member of the German Crystallographic Society and received the Carl Hermann Medal in 2000.

Bibliography

External links 
 
 Website at the Austrian Academy of Sciences

References 

1916 births
2012 deaths
Academic staff of the Karlsruhe Institute of Technology
Academic staff of the Ludwig Maximilian University of Munich
Crystallographers
Mineralogists
University of Greifswald alumni
University of Göttingen alumni
Academic staff of the University of Marburg
Officers Crosses of the Order of Merit of the Federal Republic of Germany
Members of the Bavarian Academy of Sciences
Members of the Austrian Academy of Sciences
Max Planck Society people
20th-century German physicists
Academic staff of the University of Würzburg